Samuel or Sam Wood may refer to:

Samuel H. Wood, CEO and scientist who cloned himself
Samuel Peploe Wood (1827–1873), English artist
Sam Wood (1884–1949), American film director
Samuel Wood (Ontario politician) (1830–1913), Canadian politician
Samuel Wood (philanthropist), a founder of the New York Institute for the Blind
Samuel Newitt Wood (1825–1891), American populist politician from Kansas
Samuel Wood (Lower Canada politician) (1787–1848), farmer and political figure in Lower Canada
Sam Wood (artist), game artist
Sam Wood (rugby league, born 1993), English rugby league player
Sam Wood (rugby league, born 1997), English rugby league player
Sam Wood (archaeologist), archaeologist and TV presenter
Sam Wood (cricketer) (born 1993), English cricketer
Sam Wood (footballer) (born 1986), English footballer

See also
S. A. M. Wood (1823–1891), Confederate Civil War General
Samuel Woods (disambiguation)
Sir Samuel Hill-Wood (1872–1949), English cotton magnate, cricketer and politician
Sam Taylor-Wood (born 1967), English filmmaker, photographer and visual artist